Pijnackeria hispanica, commonly known as the Spanish walkingstick or the Spanish stick insect, is a species of Phasmid (stick insect) in the family Diapheromeridae. It is found in Spain and France. This species' color can be turquoise, brown, or green. P. hispanica usually feeds on rose leaves. This phasmid is slender with short antennae and yellow or brown eyes with a black horizontal stripe or pseudopupil.

References

Insect taxa
Insects described in 1878
Diapheromeridae